Neville Ferreira (8 December 1910 – 22 April 1990) was a South African cricketer. He played in four first-class matches for Eastern Province from 1933/34 to 1938/39.

See also
 List of Eastern Province representative cricketers

References

External links
 

1910 births
1990 deaths
South African cricketers
Eastern Province cricketers
Place of birth missing